Drescher Inlet, also known as Dreschereisfrontkerbe, is an inlet or iceport in the front Riiser-Larsen Ice Shelf on the coast of Queen Maud Land, Antarctica. Some 25 km long and 3 km wide, it was named after Eberhard Drescher (1944–1983), a marine biologist at Germany's Alfred Wegener Institute for Polar and Marine Research.

Important Bird Area
A 368 ha site on fast ice near the inlet has been designated an Important Bird Area (IBA) by BirdLife International because it supports a colony of about 6,600 emperor penguinss, the number estimated from 2009 satellite imagery. Weddell seals are also known to breed in the vicinity.

References 

 

Important Bird Areas of Antarctica
Penguin colonies
Ports and harbours of Queen Maud Land
Princess Martha Coast